Abdurresid Ibrahim (Siberian Tatar. Әптрәшит Ипрағимов 1857 in Tara, Tobolsk Governorate (in today's Omsk oblast) – 1944) was a Russia-born Tatar Muslim Alim (singular of Ulama), journalist, and traveller who initiated a movement in the first decade of the 20th century to unite the Crimean Tatars. He visited Japan in Meiji period and became the first imam of Tokyo Camii (Tokyo Mosque).

Biography

Abdrashit Gumerovich Ibragimov (Gabderrashit bin Gumer bin Ibrahim bin Gabderrashid bin Gabderrahim) born on April 23, 1857, in the Tara  town of the Tarski district of the Tobolsk province of the West-Siberian General Government, now the administrative center of the Tarsky district of the Omsk Oblast. His ancestors by language and origin were Turkic peoples. He has the brother Ishmael. Abdrashit Ibrahimov attributed himself to the Tatars, and his father Gumer was Siberian Bukharans.  His father's grandfather Gabdrashit was the Akhoond of the Tara town, one of the founders of the town's stone mosque. Mother - Gafafa Bin Ibragim Bin Zhagfar (? —1871), teacher for about 40 years, and mother's father Ibragim came from the Bashkirs of the Almenevo, Kurgan Oblast village, in the Tara city served as Mullah.

He studied since the age of seven, received his primary education from a teacher Zeinalbashir, and at the age of 10 he studied in the madrasa of the Almenevo village. At the age of 17, he became an orphan and left for the Tyumen city where he continued his studies at the Yana Avyl Madrasa, and then, at the Madrasa of the Qışqar village (now in the Arsky District of Tatarstan. In 1878–1879, he was a teacher in the Akmolinsk Oblast (Russian Empire).

In 1879–1885, he continued his education in Medina, Mecca and Istanbul.

He returned to Russia in 1885. From 1885, he served as the imam-khatib of the cathedral mosque in Tara, where he was also a mudarris of madrasa. In 1892–1894, he served as the qadi of the Orenburg Muslim Spiritual Assembly.

In his youth, A. Ibragimov adhered to the Jadid ideas. A. Ibrahimov, who led the anti-czarist propaganda work from the Pan-Islamism standpoint among the Muslims of Russia, set as its goal the liberation of all Muslim peoples from any kind of colonial oppression by the "infidels". In this situation, Japan, a longtime rival of Russia in the Far East - like the Ottoman Empire in the west - was a natural ally of the Pan-Islamists. Japan's rapid industrial ascension fascinated him - as did for the many others anti-imperialist-minded nationalists of the East. Counting on creating a united anti-Russian Muslim front of action, Ibragimov visited the Ottoman Empire in 1897. In 1897–1900 travels from Istanbul to Egypt, Palestine and Hejaz, then to France, Italy, Austria, Serbia, Bulgaria. Through the south of Russia to the Caucasus, along the Caspian coast to Bukhara, Turkestan, Semirechye region. Siberian caravan route returns to Tara.

In 1898, he was entitled to participate at the election of the public members of the Tara Town Council for the second four years term for 1898–1902.

Since 1900 in Saint Petersburg, in its printing house, in Chagatai language have been published the magazine "Миръат"  (Mirror; 1900–1903, 1907–1909, only 22 editions have been published), the newspaper "Өлфәт" (Friendship; 1905-1907 which circulations reaches 4,000 copies), the magazine "Нәҗат"  ("Salvation; 1907) and in Arabic, the newspaper «әт‑Тилмиз»           ( "The Pupil"; 1906–1907).

In 1902, he was entitled to participate at the elections of the public members of the Tara Town Council for the third four-year term for 1902–1906.

In 1902, Ibragimov, becoming an uncomfortable figure for Turkey, received the order from Sultan Abdul-Hamid II to leave the Ottoman Empire. In 1902–1903, he visited Japan for the first time, where he participated in anti-Russian propaganda. In this regard, Ibragimov, at the request of the Russian consul in Japan, was expelled from the country. Arriving in Istanbul in 1904, he was arrested, handed over to the Russian consul and sent under guard to Odessa. At the turn of 1905-1906 Ibrahimov was released. Being the former board member of the Muslim community of Orenburg, he became one of the leaders of the Ittifaq al-Muslimin movement and the organizer of several Muslim congresses. At the First All-Russian Muslim Congress in Nizhny Novgorod, A. Ibragimov's main rival was Ayaz Ishaki.

1905-1907 - member of the central committee of the Muslim party Ittifaq al-Muslimin (Union of The Muslims).

In his book Alem-i İslâm, Abdur-Reshid Ibrahim defended Siddiq Hasan Khan (Nawab of Bhopal) from his detractors saying that; Khan was a pious Muslim whose enemies only hated him because he forbade them from the worship of stones and graves.

Trip to China 
Abdurresid visited China in 1909. He stayed there from June to September trying to learn more about Chinese Muslims. He developed an amicable relationship with Wang Kuan, an Ahong at the Oxen Street Mosque in Beijing, though he was critical of Wang Kuan's Arabic skills. While he praised the commitment of Chinese Muslims to Islamic rules, he felt that the Chinese Ahongs were stubborn when corrected, saying that:"People who call themselves ulama and ahong do not deserve to be ulama, as compared with Muslims in Imperial Russia or other countries."He was also critical of their traditional narrative of the entry of Islam into China:"The creed of the Chinese people in this respect is peculiar .... They say, ‘Islam had already entered into Kuntun [Guangdong] City from southern China in the era of peace [the era of Prophet Muhammad], and the second time, it came into Beijing from Chinese Turkestan’. The faith of the Chinese in this respect is contrary to the whole of history and the Hadith. However, regarding this matter, all the Muslims in China are in accord. There are many books about this. […] They call an old masjid in today’s Kuntun [Guangdong] Seyyidan Sa’d bin Vakkâs Masjid.

Besides this, there is a family named Van Kuan [Wang Kuan] among the Chinese and they regard themselves as the offspring of Vakkâs ...... This history is indisputable to the Chinese and it would seem to be impossible to persuade them that this was not the case ..... Sa’d bin Vakkâs was a famed person among the Noble Companions and the ten companions who were promised Paradise, and his biography is well known to Muslims. If Vakkâs had been an envoy [from the Arabs to China], the great Hadith scholars would have recorded it ... because some of them would have understood that anything that happened in the era of our Prophet Muhammad would have to be written down, without ignoring the slightest detail. If an envoy had been dispatched to China like this, Hadith scholars should have recorded it.

However, it is very natural that the Chinese would not like to have their history denied like that. For a very long time, for whatever reason, each nation’s [millet] confidence in its history has been almost a matter of faith, no nation has ever wanted to have it denied, let alone refuted. This is a very strange condition, and in my opinion, it is the evidence that human beings are blind."

References

Bibliography 
 アブデュルレシト・イブラヒム（小松香織、小松久男訳） 『ジャポンヤ：イスラム系ロシア人の見た明治日本』 第三書館、1991年
 小松久男「アブデュルレシト・イブラヒム」大塚和夫ほか編『岩波イスラーム辞典』岩波書店、2002年
 小松久男『イブラヒム、日本への旅』刀水書房、2008年

1857 births
1944 deaths
People from Omsk Oblast
People from Tarsky Uyezd
Siberian Tatar people
Russian Muslims
Russian expatriates in Japan